The Bosniak Party (Cyrillic: Бошњачка странка, abbr. BS) is a conservative and national conservative political party of the Bosniak minority in Montenegro. Its founder and first leader was Rafet Husović, while the party is currently led by Ervin Ibrahimović, MP, who is also serving as the party's parliamentary group leader in the Parliament of Montenegro.

History
This party was founded in 2006 by Rafet Husović and was officially registered with the Ministry of Justice on 24 March 2006. It was formed by unification of the Slavic Muslim-oriented parties in Montenegro: International Democratic Union, Bosniak Democratic Alternative, Muslim-Bosniak Alliance, and Party of National Equality, in February of the same year. At the legislative elections in Montenegro in March 2009, the Bosniak Party was a part of victorious Coalition for a European Montenegro, alongside the DPS, SDP, and HGI. Thus, this party holds two seats in the Parliament of Montenegro, and has a Deputy Prime Minister and two Ministers in the Government of Montenegro. From its founding up until 2021, Bosniak Party was led by its founder Rafet Husović.

Electoral performance

Legislative elections

Local elections in 2014 and 2018

References

Bosniaks of Montenegro
Bosniak political parties
Political parties established in 2006
2006 establishments in Montenegro
Social conservative parties
Conservative parties in Montenegro
Member parties of the European People's Party
National conservative parties
Pro-European political parties in Montenegro
Political parties of minorities in Montenegro